Baldwin Valley is an ice-filled valley in the Saint Johns Range, lying northwest of Pond Peak in Victoria Land of Antarctica. It was named by the Advisory Committee on Antarctic Names for Russel R. Baldwin, U.S. Navy, who was in charge of the Airfield Maintenance Branch at McMurdo Station in 1962.

References
 

Valleys of Victoria Land
Scott Coast